Lin Jeng-yi was Director of National Palace Museum of the Republic of China from 20 May 2016 to 16 July 2018.

Early life
Lin obtained a Master of Arts from School of Culture Resources, Taipei National University of the Arts in 2003 and a PhD from Department of Fine Arts, National Taiwan Normal University.

He served as Director of National Taiwan Museum of Fine Arts (2005-2006), Director of National Taiwan Craft Research Institute (2006-2010) and National Taiwan Craft Research and Development Institute (2010-2011), Director of National Taiwan Symphony Orchestra (2011-2012), and Chief Operating Officer of Chimei Museum.

From May 2016 to July 2018, he served as Director of National Palace Museum.

References

Directors of National Palace Museum
Living people
Taipei National University of the Arts alumni
National Taiwan Normal University alumni
Year of birth missing (living people)